Magazine Publishers was a pulp magazine publishing house established by Harold Hersey and later owned by A. A. Wyn in 1929.  Under Wyn, it was known as "Ace Magazines", hence titles such as Ace Mystery and Ace Sports.  They also used the name "Periodical House", and also branched out to publishing comic books as Ace Comics.  In the 1940s the company also began publishing books.  

In 1952 Wyn founded Ace Books, and by the mid-fifties Wyn had sold most or all of his hardback rights, and may also have ceased publishing magazines by that time to focus on Ace Books.

Magazines
Ace Detective Magazine
Ace Mystery
Ace Sports
Detective-Dragnet (later changed to Ten Detective Aces)
Flying Aces (later became Flying Models and sold off)
Love Fiction Weekly
Secret Agent X
Western Trails

Pulp Heroes
 Captain Hazzard
 Moon Man
 Secret Agent X
 Wade Hammond

==
Book publishing companies of the United States
Pulp magazine publishing companies of the United States
Publishing companies established in the 1930s